Miklós Gábor (7 April 1919 – 2 July 1998) was a Hungarian actor, most remembered for his roles in films Valahol Európában and Mágnás Miska. He was husband to Éva Ruttkai, and later Éva Vass.

Miklós Gábor was born 7 April 1919, in Zalaegerszeg. After finishing the Academy of Drama in 1941, he joined the Madách Theatre. From 1945-1954 he was the member of the National Theatre, leaving in 1975 for the Katona József theatre in Kecskemét. From 1979 to 1984, he worked in the Népszínház theatre, after he returned to the National Theatre. In 1991, he joined the Független Színpad theatre. He died on 2 July 1998, in Budapest.

Selected filmography

Film

 Európa nem válaszol (1941) - Karmester
 Beáta és az ördög (1941) - Gino, Giulietta szerelmese
 A cigány (1941) - Peti - Zsiga fia
 Valahol Európában (1948) - Hosszú
 Mickey Magnate (1949) - Miska
 Kis Katalin házassága (1950) - Baranyai
 Különös házasság (1951) - Bernáth Zsiga
 Erkel (1952) - Egressy Béni
 The State Department Store (1953) - Kocsis Ferenc
 Budapesti tavasz (1955) - Pintér Zoltán
 A 9-es kórterem (1955) - Málnási doktor
 Az eltüsszentett birodalom (1956) - Narrátor
 Éjfélkor (1957) - Károlyi János
 Sóbálvány (1958) - Erdei
 A harangok Rómába mentek (1958) - Tanár úr
 Kard és kocka (1959) - Árvay Ferenc kapitány
 Három csillag (1960) - Márkus Imre
 Alázatosan jelentem (1960) - Benedek Zoltán õrnagy, "Mikádó"
 Alba Regia (1961) - Hajnal
 Az utolsó vacsora (1962) - Dánusz Tamás
 Nedele ve vsední den (1962) - Kelemen
 Kertes házak utcája (1963) - Palotás
 Párbeszéd (1963) - Szalkay
 Egy ember, aki nincs (1964) - Tímár százados
 Már nem olyan idöket élünk (1964) - Telkes Zoltán
 Miért rosszak a magyar filmek? (1964) - Fodor
 Négy lány egy udvarban (1964) - Erõs Géza
 Ha egyszer húsz év múlva (1964) - Kénitz, Miklós
 Álmodozások kora (1964) - Flesch fõmérnök
 Másfél millió (1964)
 Játék a múzeumban (1966) - Barcza
 Apa-Egy hit naplója (1966) - Apa
 Falak (1968) - Benkõ Béla
 Kötelék (1968) - Molnár Karcsi (voice)
 Az idő ablakai (1969) - Sinis
 N.N. a halál angyala (1970) - Korin György, pszichológus
 Csak egy telefon (1970) - Dr. Forgács György
 Sértés (1979) - Igor
 Ki beszél itt szerelemről? (1980) - Parlament elnöke
 Circus Maximus (1980) - Civil
 Keserű igazság (1986) - Palócz
 Szerelő (1992, Short) - Az író
 Pá, Drágám! (1994)

Television
 Papucs (1958, TV Movie) - János
 Honfoglalás I-II. (1963, TV Movie) - Bálint
 Csiribiri (1965, TV Short) - Pál
 A helység kalapácsa (1965, TV Movie) - Lantos
 A Hanákné ügy (1969, TV Movie) - Bakonyai
 Az ördög cimborája (1973, TV Movie) - Burgoyne tábornok
 Római karnevál (1975, TV Movie) - Az író
 Vivát Benyovszky! 1-13. (1975, TV Mini-Series) - Blanchard
 Ősbemutató (1975, TV Movie)
 Közjáték Vichyben (1981, TV Movie) - Von Berg
 Holtak hallgatása (1982, TV Movie)
 Sértés (1983, TV Movie)
 Békestratégia (1985, TV Movie)
 Villanyvonat (1985, TV Movie) - Apa
 Privát kopó (1994, TV Series) - Csók Pál

References
 - Miklós Gábor in the Hungarian Theatrical Lexicon (György, Székely. Magyar Színházművészeti Lexikon. Budapest: Akadémiai Kiadó, 1994. ), freely available on mek.oszk.hu

External links
Miklós Gábor on filmkatalogus.hu
 

1919 births
1998 deaths
Hungarian male stage actors
Hungarian male film actors
People from Zalaegerszeg
20th-century Hungarian male actors
Burials at Farkasréti Cemetery